Pyrrolizidine is a heterocyclic organic compound that forms the central chemical structure of a variety of alkaloids known collectively as pyrrolizidine alkaloids. It is one of five classes of iminosugars. These are often synthesized from a carbohydrate.

References

Pyrrolizidines